Dahd Sfeir (20 July 1932 – 17 August 2015) was a notable Uruguayan actress of Lebanese descent.

She was awarded the Helen Hayes Award in 1996.

Sfeir was married to author Carlos María Gutiérrez.

References

1932 births
2015 deaths
Actresses from Montevideo
Uruguayan people of Lebanese descent
Uruguayan exiles
Uruguayan expatriates in Sweden
Uruguayan expatriates in Cuba
Uruguayan expatriates in Venezuela
Uruguayan stage actresses